Casali del Manco is a town and comune of the province of Cosenza in the Calabria region of southern Italy, located east of Cosenza. It was formed in May 2017 from the union of five previous municipalities, Casole Bruzio, Pedace, Serra Pedace, Spezzano Piccolo and Trenta. It was established following a referendum held on 26 March 2017. In Spezzano Piccolo voters expressed themselves against the proposed union, but this was not enough to retain the status of comune.

References

Cities and towns in Calabria